London Cornish RFC is a rugby union club which was originally formed for Cornish expats in London. It was established in 1962 by a group who met in Fleet Street's Cock Tavern, and were originally known as the ″Cornish Exiles″.

The club changed its name to ″London Cornish″ shortly thereafter and played occasional fixtures in a variety of locations until moving to the current ground, the Richardson Evans Memorial Playing Fields just off the A3 and the current venue for the Rosslyn Park 7s. These grounds have been rented to the club ever since by Wimbledon and Putney Common Conservators. The club moved their once a week training venue to Rosslyn Park FC's all weather surface at the start of the 2016–17 season, and their post match venue to the Roehampton CC Clubhouse at the same time. With no direct and sustainable sources of income, the club relies upon sponsorship and fundraising to survive.

The advent of the league system saw London Cornish join the Middlesex leagues and there they stayed until the season of 1997–98 when the club transferred to Surrey 3. After one season in the new league, London Cornish saw improvements, achieving four promotions in seven years. A decade at level 7 followed, but following two play-off defeats when finishing 2nd in London 2 South West in 2014–15 and 2015–16, London Cornish stormed to the title in 2016–17, registering the league's first ever 22 match unbeaten season in the process. Since 2017–18, with the club playing at its highest ever level, Cornish have retained their place in Level 6 London 1 South. In 2022–23, following a league reorganisation, Cornish will play in the newly formed Regional 2 Thames division. London Cornish run three teams, all of which compete in leagues and in 2022–23 will launch a Minis section.

The current Director of Rugby and Head Coach, Redruth born Dickon Moon, has been in the role since 2003, having joined the club from Old Patesians RFC. Dickon was voted Middlesex RFU Volunteer of the Year in 2014 and was awarded the Paul Smales Medallion for 'Services to Cornwall from a Cornishman living outside Cornwall' in 2015, the citation given for 'Outstanding service to Cornish rugby'. From Dec 2021 he is supported by Head Coach Paul Spivey.

Honours
 Surrey 3 champions (2): 1997–98, 2001–02
 Surrey 2 champions: 2003–04
 Hampshire 1 v Surrey 1 promotion play-off winner: 2004–05
 London 2 South West champions: 2016–17

See also

Rugby union in London
London Irish
London Scottish
London Welsh
Middlesex RFU
Cornwall RFU

References

 Cornish Rugby and Cultural Identity: a socio-historical perspective by Andy Seward

External links
 Official site

English rugby union teams
Rugby clubs established in 1962
Cornish rugby union teams
Rugby union clubs in London